The 1996 Arkansas Razorbacks football team represented the University of Arkansas during the 1996 NCAA Division I-A football season.

Schedule

References

Arkansas
Arkansas Razorbacks football seasons
Arkansas Razorbacks football